The Treaty of Joint Defence and Economic Co-operation of the League of Arab States (commonly, the Joint Defence and Economic Co-operation Treaty) is a treaty among the member states of the Arab League signed on 18 June 1950 in Cairo, Egypt.

The Treaty created two of the principal institutions of the Arab League:
the Joint Defence Council
the Economic Council (renamed Economic and Social Council in 1980)
Both councils report to the Council of the Arab League.

References

Bibliography

External links
 English translation of the treaty

Arab League treaties
Treaties concluded in 1950
Economy of the Arab League
20th-century military alliances
Treaties entered into force in 1952
Treaties of the Syrian Republic (1930–1963)
Treaties of Jordan
Treaties of the Kingdom of Iraq
Treaties of Saudi Arabia
Treaties of the Kingdom of Egypt
Treaties of the Mutawakkilite Kingdom of Yemen
Treaties of Lebanon
Treaties of Algeria
Treaties of Morocco
Treaties of the Republic of the Sudan (1956–1969)
Treaties of Tunisia
Treaties of the Somali Republic
Treaties of the United Arab Emirates
Treaties of the Kingdom of Libya
Treaties of Kuwait
Treaties of Mauritania
Treaties of Oman
Treaties of Qatar
Treaties of Bahrain
Treaties of Djibouti
Treaties of the Comoros
Treaties of the State of Palestine
Military alliances involving Iraq
Military alliances involving Egypt
1950 in Egypt